Zhang Wentao (born 14 April 1993) is a Chinese footballer who currently plays as centre-back for Chinese Super League side Wuhan Three Towns.

Club career
Zhang Wentao started his professional football career in 2011 when he joined Shanghai Zobon for the 2011 China League Two campaign. The club would be taken over by Shanghai SIPG and he was placed in their youth team where he failed to break into their senior team. He would move to Chinese Super League club Shanghai Shenxin in December 2013. Zhang was promoted to Shanghai Shenxin first team squad in 2015. On 18 April 2015, he made his Super League debut in a 4–1 home defeat against Changchun Yatai.

Zhang transferred to Chinese Super League side Henan Jianye on 15 January 2019. He would make his debut in a league game on 3 March 2019 against Dalian Yifang F.C. where he came on as a late substitute for Zhong Jinbao in a 1-1 draw. After two seasons with the club he would struggle to establish himself as a vital member of the team and he would go on to be loaned out to second tier club Wuhan Three Towns in the 2021 China League One campaign. The move would turn out to be a big successes and he would go on to establish himself as a vital member of the team and help aid the club to win the league title and gain promotion as the club entered the top tier for the first time in their history. The following campaign Wuhan would make the move permanent and he would be part of the squad that won the 2022 Chinese Super League title.

Career statistics 
Statistics accurate as of match played 11 January 2023.

Honours

Club
Wuhan Three Towns
Chinese Super League: 2022.
China League One: 2021

References

External links
 

1993 births
Living people
Chinese footballers
Footballers from Guizhou
People from Guiyang
Pudong Zobon players
Shanghai Shenxin F.C. players
Henan Songshan Longmen F.C. players
Chinese Super League players
China League One players
China League Two players
Association football defenders